Hypotia diehlalis is a species of snout moth in the genus Hypotia. It was described by Viette in 1953, and is known from Madagascar.

References

Moths described in 1953
Hypotiini
Moths of Madagascar
Moths of Africa